Ellen Ford may refer to:

Ellen Ford, one of the first women in WAVES
Ellen Ford, fictional character in Self Help (The Walking Dead)

See also
Helen Ford, actress